The Four committees initiative is a proposal put forward by United Nations envoy Staffan de Mistura on 29 July 2015 as a way to start the peace process in the Syrian Civil War.

The proposal suggests inviting the Syrian government to set up four themed committees addressing primary concerns of a possible ceasefire, reconstruction, political election process, the military and security. The committees are to be composed of selected people from the government and opposition. The government has agreed to the proposal but did not make promises of any binding accords as a result.

The opposition has currently completely ruled out cooperation in the initiative.

References

Politics of Syria
2015 in the Syrian civil war
Syrian peace process